Grand Morbid Funeral is the fourth studio album by Swedish death metal band Bloodbath. It was released by Peaceville Records on 17 November 2014.

Background

Grand Morbid Funeral was recorded in 2014 at Ghost Ward and City of Glass in Stockholm, Sweden and self-produced by the band. It was released on 17 November 2014 by Peaceville Records. This is the first Bloodbath album to feature vocalist Nick Holmes from UK metal band Paradise Lost after Mikael Åkerfeldt of Opeth left, having lost interest in performing death metal. Anders "Blakkheim" Nystrom of the band states that the album is "destructive, raw, heavy, organic and sludgy death metal."

The album features guest appearances from Chris Reifert and Eric Cutler from death metal band Autopsy.

Critical reception

Blabbermouth described the "unapologetic fury" of Grand Morbid Funeral and stated that the album "brings the same old-school, brutalized death metal Bloodbath has been hailed for". MetalSucks commented that new singer "Holmes' voice is just the worm-gut-strewn axe-to-the-skull this music needs" and stated that "if you've spent most of 2014 waiting around to get leveled by a death metal record with a little legacy heft, you might want to get out there and snatch up the new Bloodbath". The review in Exclaim! stated that "Bloodbath have upped the brutality ante with Grand Morbid Funeral" and claimed that Holmes has "surpassed expectations with powerful and sinister throat-gurgling delivery".

Track listing

Personnel
Names given as credited in album credits (real names in brackets).

Bloodbath
 Old Nick – vocals
 Blakkheim – lead guitars, backing vocals 
 Sodomizer – guitars 
 Lord Seth – bass guitar 
 Axe – drums

Guest musicians
Chris Reifert – guest vocals on "Grand Morbid Funeral"
Eric Cutler – guitar solos on "Total Death Exhumed", "Mental Abortion" and "Unite in Pain"
Nothing – guest solo on "My Torturer"

Additional credits
Thomas Eberger – mastering
Néstor Ávalos – artwork
David Castillo – mixing

References

2014 albums
Bloodbath albums
Peaceville Records albums